Charles W. Eagles is an American historian. He is the William F. Winter Professor of History Emeritus at the University of Mississippi and the author of several books about the civil rights movement.

Selected bibliography
 
  Winner of the 2010 Lillian Smith Book Award.
  Winner of the 1993 Lillian Smith Book Award.

References

External links
Charles W. Eagles on C-SPAN

Living people
University of North Carolina at Chapel Hill alumni
University of Mississippi faculty
21st-century American historians
American male non-fiction writers
1946 births
21st-century American male writers